Freetricity is a company that provides residential solar power systems under the feed-in tariffs in the United Kingdom. It was started by Ben Way and Paul Williams who met on The Secret Millionaire.

Overview
It is reported that the company has access to between $50 million and $700 million in funding for the UK market. They are registered under the Renewable Energy Assurance Ltd's Renewable Energy Consumer Code (REAL).

In 2012, the company entered the biomass heating system and heat pump market under the Renewable Heat Incentive scheme.

They opposed the government Feed-in Tariff (FIT) cuts, in 2011.

References

External links
Solar Micro Inverter

Solar energy companies